Canada's Wonderland is a  theme park located in Vaughan, Ontario. Opened in 1981 by the Taft Broadcasting Company and The Great-West Life Assurance Company as the first major theme park in Canada, it remains the country's largest amusement park. More than 45 attractions including rides, stores, and restaurants have been removed or renamed over the years.

Former attractions 
The following are attractions which have been removed or replaced:

Former shows

Former restaurants and shops

Renamed attractions, restaurants, and shops 
A number of rides and attractions have been renamed to correspond with area theme changes.

See also 
 List of Canada's Wonderland attractions

References 

Lists of former amusement park attractions
Toronto-related lists